The 2014–15 season is AE Larissa F.C. Football Club's 51st year in existence as a football club.

Players

Squad statistics

Updated as of 17 May 2015, 00:08 UTC. (After AEL - AEK)

FOOTBALL LEAGUE 2014-15 Promotion Play Offs

Greek football clubs 2014–15 season
Athlitiki Enosi Larissa F.C. seasons